Du Iz Tak is a 2016 picture book by Carson Ellis. The story, told in an invented insect language, is about some bugs who discover a plant shoot emerging from the ground. The book was a recipient of a 2017 Caldecott Honor for its illustrations.

In Other Media
In 2018, a short animated film version was released by Weston Woods Studios, a division of Scholastic, adapted, directed, and animated by Galen Fott. It has screened in many film festivals around the world. The audio-book won the 2019 Odyssey Award for Excellence in Audiobook production from the American Library Association The audiobook was written by Carson Ellis and narrated by Eli and Sebastian D’Amico, Burton, Galen and Laura Fott, Sarah Hart, Bella Higginbotham, Evelyn Hipp and Brian Hull.

References

2016 children's books
American picture books
Caldecott Honor-winning works
Candlewick Press books